Kistenuten is a  tall mountain in southern Norway. It is located in the Ryfylkeheiane mountains at the tripoint border of three different counties (and three municipalities):  Suldal municipality in Rogaland county, Ullensvang municipality in Vestland county, and Vinje municipality in Vestfold og Telemark county. The mountain is the fourth tallest mountain in Vestfold og Telemark county, the second tallest in Rogaland county, but it is not even in the top 25 tallest mountains in Vestfold county.

See also
List of mountains of Norway

References

Mountains of Rogaland
Mountains of Vestland
Mountains of Vestfold og Telemark
Suldal
Ullensvang
Vinje